Dmytro Vynohradets (born 25 May 1985) is a Paralympic swimmer from Ukraine. He competes in S3, SB2 (breaststroke) and SM3 (individual medley) events.

Career history
Vynohradets competed in the 2008 Summer Paralympics in Beijing. He won gold in both 50m and 200m freestyle with world record times.  In the 100m freestyle he finished second to Jianping Du who also set a new world record, Dmytro also finished third behind Jianpung who again broke the world record in the 50m backstroke.

, Vynohradets is IPC World Record holder in S3 50m and 100m freestyle events.

References

External links 
 
 Dmytro Vynohradets – Glasgow 2015 IPC Swimming World Championships at the International Paralympic Committee

1985 births
Living people
Ukrainian male freestyle swimmers
S3-classified Paralympic swimmers
Paralympic swimmers of Ukraine
Paralympic medalists in swimming
Paralympic gold medalists for Ukraine
Paralympic silver medalists for Ukraine
Paralympic bronze medalists for Ukraine
Swimmers at the 2008 Summer Paralympics
Swimmers at the 2012 Summer Paralympics
Medalists at the 2008 Summer Paralympics
Medalists at the 2012 Summer Paralympics
Medalists at the World Para Swimming Championships
Medalists at the World Para Swimming European Championships
Ukrainian male backstroke swimmers
Ukrainian male butterfly swimmers
Ukrainian male breaststroke swimmers
Ukrainian male medley swimmers
21st-century Ukrainian people